Lapataganj – Sharad Joshi Ki Kahaniyon Ka Pata is an Indian television sitcom, aired on SAB TV from October 2009 to 15 August 2014. The series is based on Sharad Joshi’s novel of the same name.

The show was produced by Ashwini Dheer and directed by Dharam Verma. Joshi's daughter Neha Sharad was the creative head of the show for first six months.

Lapatagnj starred Rohitash Gaud, Vineet Kumar, Preeti Amin, Sucheta, Shubhangi Gokhale, and the first episode aired on  26 October 2009.

Synopsis
Based in an imaginary small town called Lapataganj (meaning a lost place), the story is inspired by the writings of Sharad Joshi, who was a Hindi satirist. His wide range of work has highlighted the bitter truth of Indian society with a satirical punch. These stories, while making viewers laugh, also make them empathize with the situations people face in their daily lives.

Lapataganj is a town in some part of India which has been long forgotten by the system. The town struggles daily for basic facilities, yet the people residing there are the happiest of the lot. The show captures the spirit of the common man to lead a happy life against all odds.

Seasons

Season 1
Premiere: 26 October 2009
Finale: 11 January 2013
No. of episodes:767

Season 2
Premiere: 10 June 2013
Finale: 15 August 2014
No. of episodes: 311

The 2nd season, titled Lapataganj – Ek Baar Phir, replaced by the show Hum Aapke Hain In Laws and started its airing on 10 June 2013. This season had taken a 6-year leap in the show.

Cast 
 Rohitashv Gaud as Mukundilal Gupta 
 Sucheta Khanna as Indumati Gupta, Mukundi's wife 
 Vineet Kumar as Kachua Prasad/Kachua Chacha
 Shubhangi Gokhale as Mishri Mausi 
 Neel Patel as Chukundi 
 Anup Upadhyay as Chhotu Mama/Mamaji 
 Krishna Bhatt as Elizabeth Yadav/Elija
 Rakesh Srivastav as Lallan 
Mamta Gurnani/ Mamta Verma as Bindumati
 Kajal Nishad as Chameli, Lallan's sister 
 Sunil Kumar as Sutti Lal 
 Soma Rathod as Mircha, Sutti Lal's wife 
 Abbas Khan as Pappu Pandey alias Biji Pandey
 Preeti Amin as Surili (2009-2012)
 Aditi Tailang as Surili (2013 onwards)
 Shilpa Shinde as Mary Demello (season 2)
 Vineet Raina as Bajrang Bajpai/Lakhan (season 2)
 Ashutosh Sinha as Guddu
 Firoz Ali as Thakursaab

Awards 
The show and its actors won awards during its run time - including Indian Telly Awards, Indian Television Academy Awards, Zee Gold Awards.

References

External links

Lapataganj Official Site on SAB TV

Sony SAB original programming
Indian comedy television series
Indian television sitcoms
2009 Indian television series debuts
2014 Indian television series endings
Television shows based on Indian novels
2000s Indian television series
Fictional populated places in India
Television shows set in India